In 1864, a committee for construction of a standard gauge railway line connecting Zittau - Reichenau (Bogatynia) - Frýdlant - Liegnitz (Legnica) was established. Negotiations with governments and investors failed.

In 1884, a narrow gauge railway connecting Zittau with Markersdorf via Reichenau was built. As a result, new plans for construction of a  gauge line connecting Frýdlant and Zittau were drawn up. In 1899, a concession for construction along a Frýdlant - Dětřichov - Heřmanice route was granted. Public transport, operated by Friedländer Bezirksbahn, started in August 1900.

The line was closed in January 1976. The track was removed and some bridges were dismantled in 1996.

4 years later, The group opened a museum dedicated to this former line. On the other hand, this would later planned to turn into a bike path.

References

Railway lines in the Czech Republic
Railway lines opened in 1900
750 mm gauge railways in the Czech Republic